The 2022–23 Football Superleague of Kosovo season, also known as the ALBI MALL Superleague of Kosovo for sponsorship reasons with Albi Mall is the 24th season of top-tier football in Kosovo. The season began on 13 August 2022 and ended in May/June 2023. A total of 10 teams are competing in the league: eight teams from the 2021–22 season and two teams from the 2021–22 First Football League of Kosovo. Ballkani are the defending champions from the previous season.

Teams
Ten teаms will compete in the leаgue – the top eight teаms from the previous season and the two teams promoted from the First Football League of Kosovo. The promoted teаms are Trepça '89 and Ferizaj. They will replаce Ulpiana and Feronikeli.

Stаdiums and locаtions

Note: Table lists in alphabetical order.

Personnel and kits

1.

League table

Results

First half of season

Second half of season

Season statistics and awards

First goal of the season:  Endrit Krasniqi for Prishtina against Dukagjini (13 August 2022).

Top scorers

Top assisters

Hat-tricks

"Star of the Week" Award

Notes and references

Notes

References

"Star of the Week" Award

External links
 

Football Superleague of Kosovo seasons
Kosovo
Superleague